Marcovici is a Romanian surname. Notable people with the surname include:

 Sébastien Marcovici, French dancer
 Silvia Marcovici (born 1952), Romanian violinist
 Șmil Marcovici, Romanian communist

See also
 Marković
 Markovics

Romanian-language surnames